Nathaniel "Nate" Campbell III (born March 7, 1972) is an American former professional boxer who competed from 2000 to 2014, and currently works as a TV host. In boxing he held the unified WBA (Undisputed), IBF and WBO lightweight titles from 2008 to 2009, as well as having challenged for the IBF super featherweight title in 2005 and the WBO junior welterweight title in 2009.

Professional career

Early years at lightweight
Campbell turned professional in 2000 in Tallahassee and quickly stormed through his opponents. He won his first 23 fights, setting up a bout with cagey veteran Joel Casamayor in 2003.

Super featherweight
Casamayor won a unanimous decision, but many commentators, including those for HBO, believed that Campbell had fought a much closer match then what the scorecards indicated. Some commentators even stated that Campbell had won that closely fought match.

After that bout Campbell slipped into obscurity after two defeats to Robbie Peden and a loss to Francisco Lorenzo. In the first loss to Peden, Campbell appeared to drop his hands to taunt his opponent and was promptly knocked out. After these fights, many in the boxing world believed that Nate Campbell's boxing days were over.

Return to lightweight
Nonetheless, Campbell stormed back on the scene in 2005 with a big win over undefeated prospect Almazbek "Kid Diamond" Raiymkulov. In 2006 he lost a split decision to Isaac Hlatshwayo, but won an IBF title eliminator against Matt Zegan. Instead of a title shot, Campbell's next bout was another eliminator, which he won over Ricky Quiles. After knocking out Wilson Alcorro, his next bout was a split decision victory over the undefeated Juan Díaz on March 8, 2008, to become the new IBF, WBA, and WBO unified World Lightweight Champion.  Campbell was the underdog coming into the fight, as Díaz was considered too strong and too technically sound.  But Campbell surprised the boxing world by controlling the tempo of the fight.  The first 7 rounds were heavily contested but from the 8th round afterwards, Campbell completely controlled the fight as Diaz's eyes began swelling.

Campbell's first defense of his recently won WBA, WBO and IBF titles was to be against Joan Guzmán who just moved up from the Super Featherweight division. The fight was to take place at the Beau Rivage Resort & Casino, Mississippi, United States on September 13, 2008. But because Guzman weighed in more than 3 pounds above the weight limit, Campbell's titles weren't staked. Unfortunately, due to Guzman being dehydrated after trying to make the weight, the Guzman camp backed out and the fight was cancelled.

On January 10, 2009, Campbell vacated his WBA lightweight title because of concerns regarding sanctioning fees and proposed mandatory defenses.

Just as Guzman had trouble making weight, Campbell experienced a similar problem as he was supposed to defend his IBF and WBO lightweight crowns against Ali Funeka on February 14, 2009. On weigh-in however, Campbell was more than 2 pounds over the weight limit. As a result, he was removed of both titles. The fight still went on as scheduled, Funeka could have claimed the IBF and WBO titles with a victory. However, Campbell won a majority decision by the scores of 114-112, 115-111, and 113-113. Despite the win, Campbell was ineligible to regain the titles, which are now vacant. Campbell stated that he will be moving up to the 140 pound junior welterweight division after the bout.

Light welterweight
On August 1, 2009, Campbell took on 140 lbs. titlist Timothy Bradley. The Jacksonville native moved up to the light welterweight division after he failed to make the lightweight limit in his last fight against Ali Funeka. The WBO light welterweight title was at stake. The bout was held at the Agua Caliente Casino in Rancho Mirage, California.

The fight with Bradley only lasted three rounds after Campbell was unable to continue due to an internal eye injury caused by an unintentional headbutt from Bradley. Bradley was initially awarded a TKO victory by California referee David Mendoza. However, a replay showed that the injury was in fact caused by an accidental clash of heads, and should thus be ruled a no decision. Since then, the decision has been overruled to a No Contest after review by the California State Athletic Commission.

In December 2009 Campbell was granted a release from Don King Productions, and signed a new promotional contract with Golden Boy Promotions. Campbell's lead trainer is former world champion John David Jackson, and his business advisor is One Punch Productions.

Campbell fought Victor Ortíz on May 15, 2010, at the Madison Square Garden in New York. The former undisputed champion entered the ring as the underdog and eventually lost the bout by unanimous decision. On November 27, 2010, Campbell lost an eight-round decision on the Juan Manuel Márquez undercard in Las Vegas to Walter Estrada, a journeyman whose record included only three wins over winless fighters in twelve bouts between 2008–2010. On November 29, 2010, Nate Campbell announced his retirement from boxing.

Comeback

On April 21, 2011, Nate came out of retirement to fight unbeaten Danny Garcia losing a Unanimous Decision.

Nate continued being active fighting a month later winning against Sherzod Nazarov in an 8-round UD.
On September 25, 2011, Campbell lost to Khabib Allakhverdiyev.

On March 24, 2012, Nate won by TKO in 9 rounds in Dominican Republic against "Mermelada" Cayó.

On April 27, 2013, Campbell was defeated by Briton Terry Flannigan in Sheffield, United Kingdom, when the fight was stopped after 4 Rounds when Campbell pulled out when well behind on the scorecards.

Life after boxing

Campbell is now a personal trainer in his hometown of Jacksonville, Florida. He also is the TV show host of Experience The Galaxxy with Nate Campbell. The show claims to be a politically based show discussing life in the African American Community. The show is streamed live on four platforms: Ustream, YouTube, Periscope and Facebook Live.

Professional boxing record

References

External links

1972 births
Living people
Boxers from Florida
Sportspeople from Jacksonville, Florida
World Boxing Association champions
International Boxing Federation champions
World Boxing Organization champions
American male boxers
Super-featherweight boxers
Light-welterweight boxers
Welterweight boxers
World lightweight boxing champions